Utricularia garrettii is a small perennial carnivorous plant that belongs to the genus Utricularia. It is endemic to Thailand where it is only known from the type locality and represented by a single specimen. It was originally described by Peter Taylor in 1986 from a collection by H. B. G. Garrett in 1910. As of Taylor's 1989 revision of his monograph, it had not been recollected since Garrett's original collection. It is most similar to U. striatula and can be easily confused for it.

See also 
 List of Utricularia species

References 

garrettii
Carnivorous plants of Asia
Endemic flora of Thailand
Plants described in 1986